Yelamanchili Sivaji is  an Indian politician . He was a Member of Parliament, representing Andhra Pradesh in the Rajya Sabha the upper house of India's Parliament as a member of the Telugu Desam.

References

Rajya Sabha members from Andhra Pradesh
Telugu Desam Party politicians
1947 births
Living people